The Holden Apollo is a compact and later mid-size car that was distributed from 1989 to 1997 in Australia by Holden. As a successor to the GM-engineered Holden Camira, the Apollo was a rebadged version of the Toyota Camry, also sold in Australia. In paralleling two generations of the Camry—the V20 coded as the JK and facelifted JL series Apollo—and the XV10 recoded as the JM and updated JP—there were minor cosmetic differences in the grille, lights and trim.

This model sharing occurred due to the United Australian Automobile Industries (UAAI) joint venture between Toyota Australia and Holden starting in 1987 that resulted in model sharing between both automakers from August 1989. UAAI was in turn a result of the Button car plan, which aimed to make the Australian motor business more efficient and eliminate import tariffs. Production ceased in late 1996, although enough cars remained until the replacement Holden Vectra arrived in mid-1997.

Timeline
 August 1989 - JK Apollo released  
 August 1991 - JL Apollo released 
 March 1993 - JM Apollo released 
 September 1995 - JP Apollo released 
 Late 1996 - Production ends 
 June 1997 - Apollo replaced by Holden Vectra

Gallery

References

External links 
1989 Australian Holden Apollo Commercial

Apollo
Cars of Australia
Compact cars
Mid-size cars
Sedans
Station wagons
Cars introduced in 1989
1980s cars
1990s cars
Cars discontinued in 1997